Lumino City is a puzzle adventure video game developed and published by State of Play Games. The game was released for OS X and Windows in December 2014, for iOS in October 2015., and Android for 12 April 2017. It is a sequel to Lume.

Gameplay
Lumino City is a puzzle adventure video game.

Development and release
Lumino City was developed by State of Play Games. It is a sequel to Lume. Lumino City was released OS X and Windows on 3 December 2014, for iOS on 29 October 2015. and for Android on 12 April 2017 but the Android version was published by Noodlecake Studios

Reception

At the 2015 Independent Games Festival, Lumino City was nominated for the "Excellence in Visual Art". At the 2015 British Academy Games Awards, Lumino City won the "Artistic Achievement" category, and was also nominated in the categories "British Game" and "Game Innovation". The game received a nomination in the "Most Innovative" category at the 2016 Games for Change Awards.

References

External links
 

2014 video games
Adventure games
IOS games
MacOS games
Fiction about origami
Puzzle video games
Single-player video games
Windows games
Video games developed in the United Kingdom
BAFTA winners (video games)
State of Play Games games
Noodlecake Games games